Western Blood is a lost 1918 American silent Western film directed by Lynn Reynolds and starring Tom Mix. It was produced and released by Fox Film Corporation.

Cast
 Tom Mix - Tex Wilson
 Victoria Forde - Roberta Stephens
 Frank Clark - Col. Stephens
 Barney Furey - Wallace Payton
 Pat Chrisman - Juan
 Buck Jones - Cowboy (* as Buck Gebhardt)

See also
 1937 Fox vault fire
 List of lost films
 Tom Mix filmography

References

External links
 
 

1918 films
1918 Western (genre) films
Lost Western (genre) films
Films directed by Lynn Reynolds
Fox Film films
Lost American films
American black-and-white films
1918 lost films
Silent American Western (genre) films
1910s American films